Novak Roganović (Serbian Cyrillic: Новак Рогановић; 14 January 1932 – 4 February 2009) was a Serbian footballer. He was part of the Yugoslav squad that won gold at the 1960 Summer Olympics.
 
He played for FK Vojvodina, Austria Wien and Enschedese Boys.

References

External links
 Profile at Reprezentacija.rs
 Profile at austria-archiv

1932 births
2009 deaths
People from Senta
Serbian footballers
Yugoslav footballers
Yugoslavia international footballers
FK Vojvodina players
FK Austria Wien players
Olympic footballers of Yugoslavia
Footballers at the 1960 Summer Olympics
Olympic gold medalists for Yugoslavia
Association football defenders
Olympic medalists in football
Medalists at the 1960 Summer Olympics